Grimod is a French and Italian surname, held by
 Guido Grimod, mayor of Aosta
 the Grimod du Fort family, counts of Orsay:
 Pierre Grimod du Fort (1692–1748) 
 Pierre Gaspard Marie Grimod d'Orsay (1748–1809)
 Albert Gaspard Grimod (1772–1843)
 Alfred Guillaume Gabriel, Count D'Orsay (1801–1852)
 the Grimod de La Reynière family:
 Laurent Grimod de La Reynière (1733–1793), fermier général. 
 Alexandre Balthazar Laurent Grimod de La Reynière (1758–1838), son of Laurent, famous gastronome. 
 the Hôtel Grimod de La Reynière, their town house in Paris